Senator Knapp may refer to:

Anthony L. Knapp (1828–1881), Illinois State Senate
Charles L. Knapp (1847–1929), New York State Senate
H. Wallace Knapp (1869–1929), New York State Senate